Sanskrit is a major classical language of ancient India.

The following is a partial list of Wikipedia articles whose titles contain the word "Sanskrit":

 Maharishi Balmiki Sanskrit University 
 Sanskrit Buddhist literature
 Sanskrit College and University, a specialized state-government administered university affiliated to the University of Calcutta
 Sanskrit Collegiate School, Kolkata, India
 Sanskrit compound, the agglutinative nominal system of Classical Sanskrit
 Sanskrit drama
 Sanskrit grammar
 Sanskrit inscriptions in the Malay world
 Sanskrit nouns
 Sanskrit Press and Depository, Bengal
 Sanskrit pronouns and determiners
 Sanskrit prosody, one of the six Vedangas, or limbs, of Vedic studies
 Sanskrit revival, the accumulation of attempts at reviving the Sanskrit language
 Sanskrit studies
 Sanskrit universities in India 
 Sanskrit verbs
 Sanskrit Wikipedia

See also
 :Category:Sanskrit
 
 
 Sanskriti (disambiguation)
 Indosphere, refers to Sanskritised areas of Asia, especially South Asia and Southeast Asia
 Sanskritisation, a particular form of social change found in India, in which castes placed lower in the caste hierarchy seek upward mobility by emulating the rituals and practices of the upper or dominant castes
 Sanskritism, a term used to indicate words that are coined out of Sanskrit for modern usage in India, Sri Lanka and elsewhere or neologisms
 SanskritOCR, an optical character recognition software for Sanskrit, Hindi and other Indian languages based on Devanagari script

Sanskrit